Dagenham Roundhouse is a pub and music venue located in Dagenham, London, England. 
It was established in 1969 as the "Village Blues Club", and from then until 1975 it was considered east London's premier rock music venue.

In 2007, filmmakers Ken Gascoigne and "H" Curran produced a documentary about the club in which they interviewed some of the artists who appeared there in its heyday, including Mick Box of Uriah Heep, Brian May of Queen, the Roundhouse Promoter Andy Townsend, and various local residents, who recalled memories of the club.

Behind the pub, in the location of the old car park, is a road called Bragg Close. This is named after the singer and poet Billy Bragg, whose family has lived in the area for over a century.

Bragg opened the street on 24 August 1999, dedicating it to his own brother, and paying tribute to Ben Tillett, the founder of the dockworkers union. It consists of 12 housing association homes.

Location

It lies roughly halfway between Upney and Becontree stations on the District line in zone 5. The Roundhouse is a stop on London Buses route 368.

Acts

Acts that have appeared there include Led Zeppelin, Genesis, Thin Lizzy, Rory Gallagher, Pink Floyd

Reunion
A Facebook nostalgia group was started for the Village Blues Club in 2008. It now has some 100+ members, and a private reunion was held in May 2012, back in the Roundhouse where it all started. The band who played there the most in its heyday, a total of 13 times, Stray, headlined the gig.

A second reunion was held in May 2013, headlined by The Big Blues Jam (Jon Amor/Pete Gage/Mark Barrett/Dave Doherty & Friends), with support by Jon Amor. (Reunion II).

A third reunion was held in September 2013, with The Pink Torpedoes (Pete Gage/Paul Hartshorn/Pete Lowrey/Dave Raeburn).
(Reunion III).

The fourth reunion took place in May 2014, once again starring Stray (Reunion IV).

Reunion V was in September 2014, again providing a link back to the original Roundhouse in that it starred Son of Man, which included George Jones, son of the original Man's Micky Jones, on guitar.

Reunion VI in May 2015 starred Martin Turner, playing the music of Wishbone Ash.

Public house
The Campaign For Real Ale (Camra) has included The Roundhouse in its database of heritage pubs in recognition of its historic interior. The entry reads:

In 2005, the pub was called a "serious cause for concern".

The licensee in 2008 was Kim Sullivan. Kim was still the licensee in 2014.

References

External links

 Documentary footage, "Brian May recalls Hawkwind and 10cc at the Village Blues Club Dagenham", and other interviews
Slideshow of 4 pictures of Rory Gallagher at the Roundhouse, 1975

Alfred W. Blomfield buildings
Buildings and structures in the London Borough of Barking and Dagenham
Music venues in London
Tourist attractions in the London Borough of Barking and Dagenham
Dagenham
Pubs in the London Borough of Barking and Dagenham